Patriarch was a magazine published from 1993 to 2004 by Philip H. Lancaster. The magazine was a self-published, bimonthly, subscription-based periodical. Lancaster was a minister in the Presbyterian Church in America (PCA) in which he was ordained in 1977. He left the PCA in 1996 since he had been serving for years in a non-Presbyterian church. He had founded Immanuel Family Fellowship in St. Louis, Missouri, in 1990, a "family-integrated church" consisting almost entirely of homeschooling families. He also served as a chaplain in the United States Army Reserve from 1981 to 1994. Patriarch was published from the Lancaster home, first in Arnold, Missouri (1993–94); then in Rolla, Missouri (1994-1998), and finally in Willis, Virginia (1998-2004). The magazine's mission was to promote a "Christ-like manhood" that is "neither tyrannical or wimpy" and a "home-centered lifestyle." The magazine promoted homeschooling, and Biblical patriarchy.

See also
Family Integrated Church

References

External links

1993 establishments in Missouri
2004 disestablishments in Virginia
Christian magazines
Defunct magazines published in the United States
Lifestyle magazines published in the United States
Magazines established in 1993
Magazines disestablished in 2004
Magazines published in Missouri
Magazines published in Virginia
Presbyterianism in the United States
Religious magazines published in the United States